Kong Pisei District is a district located in Kampong Speu Province, in central Cambodia.

It is home to a Wing Star Shoes factory.

In 2016, plans were announced for the construction of a "Chinese-funded agricultural special economic zone (SEZ) with facilities to research plant diseases." Also in 2016, damage to the Ou Treng reservoir caused flooding along National Route 3. The flood was caused by "three days of heavy rain and the release of water from the 7 Makara reservoir downstream from Kampong Speu province through the Prek Tnort river."

In February 2019, the Cambodian Mine Action Centre (CMAC) was called in to dispose of a 340 kg US M117 bomb that was discovered in Chamkar Doung village.

Administration
Kong Pisei District is subdivided into 13 communes (khum)

References

External links 

 Photo of Kong Pisei District, Preah Nipean Commune, Krang Chek

Districts of Kampong Speu province